The Argentine Women's Volleyball League is the highest women 's professional  volleyball league in Argentina . The champion team Qualifies to the South American Women's Volleyball Champion Clubs. Since 2003 it has been managed by FeVA.

The current champion is Boca Juniors and it is also the team that won the tournament for the most times with a total of six titles.

History 
The League has been managed by FeVA since 2003. Since then, teams from various parts of the country have participated, even foreign teams, such as Bohemios from Uruguay in the 2007/08 season, Over the year, the number of participating teams has varied, reaching a maximum of 16 in 2013/14 and a minimum of 4 in 2011/12.

Champions

By Club

References

External links
Argentine Volleyball Federation 
 Argentinian Liga A1. women.volleybox.net

1996 establishments in Argentina
Argentina
Professional sports leagues in Argentina
Sports leagues established in 1996
Women's volleyball in Argentina
Liga Femenina Argentino